Genesis Microchip Inc. was a supplier of integrated circuits (ICs) for video processors in flat panel LCD TVs and Monitors. It was founded in 1987 by Paul Russo  in Markham, Ontario, Canada and it became a public company in 1998  and employed over 500 people (2006) worldwide.  In 2002, Genesis acquired Sage Inc., a leading supplier of digital display technology. Two years earlier, Sage had acquired Faroudja which was known for its Emmy Award winning video processing technology.  Key video processing technology includes: DCDi, MADi, image scaling (key industry patent), color management, LCD response time compensation, and founders of DisplayPort interconnect technology now a VESA standard.

On December 11, 2007, ST Microelectronics announced the acquisition of Genesis Microchip.

References

 
 
 
 
 
 

Companies based in Markham, Ontario
Electronics companies of Canada